The Palace of Sultan Mas'ud III is a Ghaznavid palace in Ghazni, Afghanistan. The palace was built in 1112 by Sultan Mas'ūd III (1099-1114/5), son of Ibrahim of Ghazna.

Description 
There is a dado with a poem in Persian and Kufic script and one in Arabic. There is a marble arch bearing the name of the sultan. The site has a small cemetery that includes the domed ziyarat of Ibrahim of Ghazna in the west side of the palace.

External links
 Italian excavation of the Palace

References 

Buildings and structures in Ghazni Province
Palaces in Afghanistan